The Minotaur is a novel by British writer Ruth Rendell, written under the pseudonym Barbara Vine. It was first published in 2005.

External links 
Review from The Sunday Times
Review from MysteryInk
Review from The Observer
Review from The Washington Post
Review from Boston.Com
Author interview from The Telegraph from time of publication

2005 British novels
Novels by Ruth Rendell
Works published under a pseudonym
Novels set in Essex
Viking Press books
Shaye Areheart Books books